Carolyn A. Wilkins is a Canadian economist. She served as Senior Deputy Governor of the Bank of Canada. from May 2, 2014 to December 9, 2020. Wilkins was the first woman to hold the position of Senior Deputy Governor, the highest position ever held by a woman at the Bank of Canada.

Early life and education 
Wilkins was raised in Selwyn, Ontario. In 1987 she earned a BA in Economics from Wilfrid Laurier University. While at Laurier, Wilkins worked at the school pub and for Pierre Siklos, a professor in the School of Business and Economics. She spent two semesters as a co-op student working at the Ontario Ministry of Treasury and Economics and another working in marketing at IBM.

In 1988 she earned an MA in Economics from Western University in London, Ontario.

Career 
Prior to joining the Bank, Wilkins worked at both the Department of Finance Canada and the Privy Council Office, under the governments of Brian Mulroney, Kim Campbell and Jean Chrétien. The roles she held in these institutions were senior analytical roles that involved economic forecasting and fiscal policy development.

The Bank of Canada 
Carolyn Wilkins joined the Bank of Canada in 2001, starting out in the monetary and financial modelling division of the former Monetary and Financial Analysis Department. From March 2005 to March 2010, she held the position of Deputy Chief of the Financial Market Department. In this position she led the development and implementation of extraordinary liquidity tools and collateral policy used during the 2008 financial crisis. From April 2010 to October 2011, she held the position of Special Director of Over-the-counter Derivatives Market Initiatives. From November 2011 to August 2013, she held the position of Chief of the Financial Stability Department, leading the Bank's research and analysis regarding issues in the Canadian and International financial sectors, including the assessment of risks to financial system stability, and oversight of systemically important payment, clearing and settlement systems, under the Payment, Clearing and Settlement Act. From August 2013 up to her appointment as Senior Deputy Governor, Wilkins was Advisor to the Governor, with a focus on the Canadian economy with regards to the financial system, and monetary policy.

Senior Deputy Governor 
As the Senior Deputy Governor, Wilkins was in charge of the Bank of Canada's strategic planning and economic and financial research. The Senior Deputy Governor is a member of the Governing Council, who set the interest rate, and in this role shares the duty and responsibility of making decisions regarding monetary policy and financial system stability. On her appointment to the role of Senior Deputy Governor, The Minister of Finance Joe Oliver said that "Carolyn Wilkins has a distinguished career in public service, and her experience in fiscal and monetary policy making, and knowledge of financial markets is extensive." As Senior Deputy Governor, Wilkins was the Bank's G20 and G7 Deputy. Wilkins was also a member of the IMF's High Level Advisory Group on FinTech. She represented Canada on the Basel Committee on Banking Supervision (BCBS) and co-chaired the BCBS Working Group on Liquidity.

Viewpoints 
Wilkins is quoted in the Financial Post saying that: "Economics is the greatest social science because it's got this disciplined framework and logic and mathematics, but at the same time it's all about people...at the end of the day it's about how policies or situations will change the economic realities of everybody on the street out there - and you and I."

As Senior Deputy Governor, Wilson often spoke on behalf of the Bank of Canada and communicated their stance on monetary policy and other economic issues. In a talk given at the McGill University Max Bell School of Public Policy Wilkins in November 2018, Wilkins addressed pursuing the best monetary policy framework for Canada. She spoke to the current policy framework, and the Bank's the focus on targeting low and stable inflation, in the context of a flexible exchange rate, which is a formalized agreement with the federal government under the inflation control agreement. Regarding the monetary policy framework she said that, "The framework needs to focus only on objectives that monetary policy can actually achieve," these being that it is only able to affect prices in the long-run, and cannot resolve underlying structural issues such as job quality. Because of this, the Bank of Canada's monetary policy should focus on shorter-term stabilization objectives that address cyclical issues, meaning objectives that smooth the business cycle.  Regarding the framework Wilkins said that: We need to keep it simple: focus on clear objectives that monetary policy can actually achieve, and assess how it affects people...We will need to improve our methods to account for considerations such as distributional effects and financial stability. We must also ensure that the right supporting policy tools and measures are available in extraordinary circumstances.
Wilkins has also advocated for the necessity of diversity in developing monetary policy. An article by the Financial Post, quotes Wilkins saying on a panel discussion during the G7 Women's Forum in Toronto: "We're doing projects where we actually require that diversity of thought...Whether we're thinking about digitization, whether we're thinking about crypto assets, what the new economy is going to look like. We need that diversity." She said in the talk that diversity needs to be factored into the consideration of the Bank's framework of the prescience of the issue, with the levels of inequality in society rising, creating greater concern as inequality leads to volatile economic growth, and less trust in institutions.

Wilkins also spoke in regards to inequality at the G7 Symposium on Innovation and Inclusive Growth in Montebello, Quebec in February 2018 , referring to the effect of technological advances on the economy. She said in the talk that though technological innovation is key to economic growth, it has also left many behind, and that mainstream macro-economists are factoring how income distribution may affect long-term growth and macro dynamics. Wilkins said at the Symposium that central bankers do not have the mandate or tools to address this disparity by influencing the pace of technological process or income distribution, but that they have to support strong and sustainable growth, and be an advisor to analyze the tradeoffs that come with technological advancement. She suggests focusing on the development of skilled works, and keeping market power in check as two ways to address this issue. On developing skilled workers, she says, this will require reducing barriers to participation in the workforce, such as gender discrimination in the STEM fields. Keeping the market power of the tech industry in check, she says, is also important due to the potential concerns from monopoly power on prices and competition, such as lowering innovation and preventing more-inclusive growth.

In regards to financial technology, Wilkins has written and spoken often about how financial technology, such as cryptocurrencies and the digitization of the economy, should be considered in regard to the Bank's monetary policy, as technological change has a profound effect on the economy. She writes that understanding the relation between technological change and the economy is essential for monetary policy because it "appears to be changing the relationship between unemployment and inflation." In a conference address to the Rotman School of Management in March 2018, Wilkins said of cryptocurrency that she does not regard these products as currency because, "they do not perform any of the key functions of money." She said that they are concerning because they could have financial stability implications, relating to investor protection, market integrity and the use of crypto assets for illegal activities. Considering that crypto currencies are unregulated, they present financial risk, and so Wilkins suggested at the conference that international authorities should work together to build a set of policies that govern crypto assets. Outlining these issues she said:My bottom line here is that we need a sharpened focus on consumer and investor protection, and market integrity. These are foundational elements of a sound financial system because they support trust.

Awards 
Wilkins was a winner of Canada's Most Powerful Women: Top 100 Award by the Women's Executive Network in 2016 and 2018 in the category of Public Sector Leaders.

Personal life 
Wilkins has a partner, Victor, and a son named Samuel.

Publications

Bank publications 

Chapman, J., Wilkins, C.A. (2019). "Crypto 'Money': Perspective of a Couple of Canadian Central Bankers." The Bank of Canada, Staff Discussion Paper No. 1.
 Ahnert, T. Chapman, J., Wilkins, C.A. (2018). "Should Bank Capital Regulation Be Risk Sensitive?" The Bank of Canada, Staff Working Paper No. 48.
Mendes, R.R., Murchison, S., Wilkins, C.A. (2017). "Monetary Policy Under Uncertainty: Practice Versus Theory." The Bank of Canada, Staff Discussion Paper No. 13.
 Wilkins, C.A., Gomes, T. (2013). "The Basel III Liquidity Standards: An Update." The Bank of Canada, Financial System Review. 
 Wilkins, C.A., Witmer, J., Silve, J. (2011). "Access to Central Clearing Services for Over-the-Counter Derivatives." The Bank of Canada, Financial System Review. 
 Wilkins, C.A., Woodman, E. (2010). "Strengthening the Infrastructure of Over-the-Counter Derivatives Markets." The Bank of Canada, Financial System Review. 
 Wilkins, C.A., Selody, J. (2010). "The Bank of Canada's Extraordinary Liquidity Policies and Moral Hazard." The Bank of Canada, Financial System Review.
 Wilkins, C.A., Hendry, S., Lavoie, S. (2010). "Securitized Products, Disclosure, and the Reduction of Systemic Risk." he Bank of Canada, Financial System Review.
 Fontaine, J., Selody, J., Wilkins, C.A. (2009). "Improving the Resilience of Core Funding Markets." he Bank of Canada, Financial System Review.
 Zorn, L., Wilkins, C.A., Engert, W. (2009). "Bank of Canada Liquidity Actions in Response to the Financial Market Turmoil." The Bank of Canada, Bank of Canada Review - Autumn. 
 Engert, W., Selody, J., Wilkins, C.A. (2008). "Financial Market Turmoil and Central Bank Intervention." The Bank of Canada, Financial System Review.
 Selody, J., Wilkins, C.A. (2007). "Asset-Price Misalignments and Monetary Policy: How Flexible Should Inflation-Targeting Regimes Be?" The Bank of Canada, Staff Discussion Paper. 
 Tkacz, G, Wilkins, C.A. (2006). "Linear and Threshold Forecasts of Output and Inflation with Stock and Housing Prices." The Bank of Canada, Staff Working Paper No. 25. 
 Colette, D., Selody, J., Wilkins, C.A. (2006). "Another Look at the Inflation-Target Horizon." The Bank of Canada, Bank of Canada Review - Summer.
 Djoudad, R., Selody, J., Wilkins, C.A. (2005). "Does Financial Structure Matter for the Information Content of Financial Indicators?" The Bank of Canada, Staff Working Paper No. 33.
 Selody, J., Wilkins, C.A. (2004). "Asset Prices and Monetary Policy: A Canadian Perspective on the Issues." The Bank of Canada, Bank of Canada Review - Autumn.
 St-Amant, P., Wilkins, C.A. (2004). "The Evolving Financial System and Public Policy: Conference Highlights and Lessons." The Bank of Canada, Bank of Canada Review - Autumn. 
 St-Amant, P., Wilkins, C.A. (2004). "The Evolving Financial System and Public Policy: Conference Highlights and Lessons." The Bank of Canada, Financial System Review.

Refereed journal 

 Wilkins, C. (with G. Tkacz). 2008. “Linear and Threshold Forecasts of Output and Inflation with Stock and Housing Prices,” Journal of Forecasting, Vol. 27, Issue 2, pp. 131–151.

Other publications 

 Wilkins, C. (1998). "Youth and the 1990s Labour Market." Department of Finance Working Paper No. 98-08.
 Wilkins, C. (With F. Lee and S. James). (1992). "Estimating Trend Total Factor Productivity in Canada." Department of Finance Working Paper No. 92-03
 Wilkins, C. (with M. Albert). (1989). "Closed Economy Analysis of the Dynamics of Deficits and Debt in a Unitary and Federal State." Department of Finance Working Paper No. 89-01.

References 

Living people
Canadian women economists
University of Western Ontario alumni
Year of birth missing (living people)
Wilfrid Laurier University alumni